The dili tuiduk is a Turkmen musical instrument in the clarinet-family that uses a single reed to produce the instrument's sound. It is used mainly in Turkmen folk music.

The woodwind instrument is also transcribed  dilli düdük,  dilli tuyduk , dili tüidük, dilli tüidük and дилли туйдук.

Construction
The instrument has a body made from the stem of a bulrush, and a reed cut into the tube at the top (a split that forms a flexible edge that vibrates when blown).

A variant was photographed (bülban) in 1869-1872, in which the bulrush body has been replaced by a carved wooden body.  The split reed was retained as a tip, the same style of mouthpiece as on the ghoshmeh.

Dilli-tuyduk These come in two kinds. In one, the reed end of the instrument is closed and in the other it is open. A reed is cut in the upper part of the pipe and 3 or 4 finger holes are cut on the upper part, at intervals of some 5-6mm. Its range is a 6th or 7th, from about fa in the first octave to re or mi in the second. Some sounds have to be made by overblowing or by partly exposing the finger holes. The dilli-tuyduk makes a penetrating sound and is used to play the tunes of Turkmen folk songs. Versions of song tunes in the form of ditties for the dilli-tuyduk start in a long drawn-out sound going into the main melody.

See also
Sipsi, related instrument

References

External links
Dili tuiduk image, showing a pipe with four finger holes and the reed tongue (cut into the instrument's body).
 Turkmen Musical Instruments-Dilli Tuyduk. Youtube-Video

Tajik musical instruments
Turkmen musical instruments
Turkish musical instruments
Clarinets
Turkish words and phrases